The Laura Watson House was a historic house in Gainesville, Sumter County, Alabama.  The one-story, wood frame, spraddle roof house was built for Laura Watson and her son, Booker, circa 1900. It was significant as a surviving example of what was once a typical type of dwelling for small African American freeholders in Alabama.  It was added to the National Register of Historic Places on October 3, 1985.

References

National Register of Historic Places in Sumter County, Alabama
Houses on the National Register of Historic Places in Alabama
Houses in Sumter County, Alabama
Houses completed in 1900